Vero may refer to:

Geography
 Vero Beach, Florida, a city in the United States
 Vero, Corse-du-Sud, a commune of France in Corsica

Other
 Véro, a talk show on the Radio-Canada television network
 Vero (app), a social media company co-founded by Ayman Hariri
 Vero cell
 Vero man, Pleistocene-era human remains found near Vero Beach, Florida
 Vero Software Plc
 Vero (supermarket chain) in the Republic of Macedonia
 Vernon Richards, born Vero Recchioni, a twentieth century Anglo-Italian anarchist
 Vero Technologies Ltd, a former British manufacturing company
 Vero Insurance, an Australian insurance company